Events from the year 1803 in Russia

Incumbents
 Monarch – Alexander I

Events

Births

Fyodor Tyutchev died in 1873 at age LXX

Deaths

 
 
 
 Sophia Razumovskaya, courtier  (b. 1746)
 Maria Nesselrode, courtier  (b. 1786)

References

1803 in Russia
Years of the 19th century in the Russian Empire